John Huntly was an American politician. He was a member of the Wisconsin State Assembly in 1882 and 1883. Additionally, he was town clerk of Avon, Wisconsin and a justice of the peace. He was a Republican. Huntly was born on April 10, 1847, in Hamburg, New York.

References

People from Hamburg, New York
People from Avon, Wisconsin
City and town clerks
American justices of the peace
1847 births
Year of death missing
Republican Party members of the Wisconsin State Assembly